Cisco Prime (Cisco Works prior to 2011, CiscoWorks before that) is a network management software suite consisting of different software applications by Cisco Systems. Most applications are geared towards either Enterprise or Service Provider networks. There is Cisco Network Registrar among those.

Cisco claims Cisco Prime applications have the same look and feel. At least some applications packaged as both a traditional software package and also as a VMware image.

Applications 
  
Cisco Prime for IT Product

•	Offers comprehensive  management of wired/wireless access, campus, and branch networks, rich visibility into end-user connectivity, and application performance assurance

•	A self-service portal where users can order and manage any type of IT service, from data center to desktop. Whether end users order a mobile device, a virtual desktop, or an entire application-development environment in a private cloud, Cisco Prime Service Catalog helps streamline the service request and delivery process.

•	Provides deep application-aware network visibility and granular performance analytics that empower network administrators to rapidly isolate and remediate problems and improve the user experience.

•	Provides integrated, high-performance, reliable Domain Name System (DNS), Dynamic Host Configuration Protocol (DHCP), and IP Address Management (IPAM) services for the enterprise network

Voice and Video Collaboration Management

Cisco Prime Collaboration

Data Center Management

•	(NAM) Provides deep application-aware network visibility and granular performance analytics that empower network administrators to rapidly isolate and remediate problems and improve the user experience.

•	(NGA) Generates, unifies, and exports flow data in high-performance data centers, empowering network operations, engineering, and security teams to achieve operational efficiencies, improve services delivery, and harden network security

•	Cisco Prime Data Center Network Manager: (DCNM) Combines management of Ethernet and storage networks into a single dashboard to help network and storage administrators troubleshoot health and performance across the whole range of Cisco NX-OS platforms, including the Cisco Nexus and MDS 9000 Families, regardless of protocol type

Service Provider Product Portfolio

•	Analytics Provide scalable, real-time, network-centric analytics that allows for adaptation to customer environments and use cases.

•	Carrier Management Simplify the lifecycle management of carrier-grade networks and services by automating service design, fulfillment, assurance, and analysis tasks.

•	Cloud Automation Enable efficient delivery of cloud services by automating lifecycle management processes including provisioning, operations and resource management.

•	Operational Systems Software Efficiently coordinate business and operational processes for rapid design, creation, and delivery of services.

•	Endpoint Management Deploy scalable, flexible DNS, DHCP, IPAM, and AAA services, and connected home management.

•	Voice and Video Collaboration Automate voice provisioning, real-time monitoring and proactive troubleshooting across Cisco Unified Communications and Cisco TelePresence systems.

Cloud Product Portfolio

•	Cisco Intelligent Automation for Cloud Cisco Intelligent Automation for Cloud helps enable enterprise IT professionals and service providers deliver highly secure on-demand IT (ITaaS - IT as a service). By creating a more agile and cost-effective service-delivery vehicle, IT professionals can proactively meet the growing needs of a business.

•	Cisco Prime Network Services Controller The Cisco Prime Network Services Controller, formerly the Cisco Virtual Network Management Center, provides centralized device and policy management for Cisco virtual services. The virtual appliance offers transparent, scalable, and automation-centric management for virtualized enterprise data center and multitenant cloud environments.

Network management